Janumys is a genus of extinct mammal of the middle Cretaceous. It was a member of the order of Multituberculata (also extinct). It lived in North America during the Mesozoic era, also known as the "age of the reptiles." It has been provisionally placed within the informal suborder "Plagiaulacida".

The type species, Janumys erebos, was found in the Albian-Cenomanian, Lower-Upper Cretaceous boundary of the Cedar Mountain Formation in Utah (United States).

References 
 Eaton and Cifelli (2001), Multituberculate mammals from near the Early-Late Cretaceous boundary, Cedar Mountain Formation, Utah. Acta Palaeontologica Polonica 46 (4), p. 453-518.

Multituberculates
Cretaceous mammals
Prehistoric mammals of North America
Fossil taxa described in 2001
Prehistoric mammal genera